Bamba may refer to:

Persons
 Bamba (actress), Philippine actress
 Amadou Bamba, Muslim religious leader and founder of Mouridism
 Anderson Bamba, Brazilian footballer Anderson Soares de Oliveira
 Jonathan Bamba, French footballer
 Mohamed Bamba, American basketball player
 Musemestre Bamba (born 1971), Congolese footballer
 Sol Bamba, French-Ivorian footballer
 Bamba Müller, Egyptian wife of the Maharaja of Lahore
 Bamba Sutherland, last of the Punjab royalty

Places
 Bamba, Burundi
 Bamba, Gao Region, a town in the Gao Region of Mali
 Bamba, Guinea
 Bamba, Kenya, a small town in the Ganze Constituency of Kenya
 Bamba, Mopti a rural town in Mali

Other uses
 Bamba (crater), on the planet Mars
 Bamba (snack), a peanut butter snack food made in Israel and Germany
 Bambera, a Spanish type of song form associated with flamenco
 British Association of Mindfulness-Based Approaches (BAMBA)
 An Aruban musical instrument, see Music of the former Netherlands Antilles
 An alternate spelling for Quechua word pampa meaning plain, see Pampas
 an alternate name of the Amba people

See also 
 La Bamba (disambiguation)
 Baamba (disambiguation)